Youngsville is a city in Lafayette Parish, Louisiana, United States, and is part of the Lafayette metropolitan statistical area. The population was 8,105 at the 2010 U.S. census, and 15,929 at the 2020 United States census.

Youngsville was the birthplace of Louisiana businessman and politician Dudley J. LeBlanc, the entrepreneur of the Hadacol fortune of the 1950s. Bernard LeBas of Ville Platte has represented Evangeline and St. Landry parishes in the Louisiana House of Representatives since 2008. He is a former resident of Youngsville.

History
Youngsville was settled in the early 19th century by French Acadian farmers. Prior to 1839, George Roy and his son, Desire, laid out the area and named the community "Royville". The settlement had grown large enough by 1859 to establish one of the oldest Catholic churches in Lafayette Parish: St. Anne Church, on the community's oldest street, Church Street. In 1908, the U.S. Postal Service asked village leaders to change the name because the town was being confused with the north Louisiana town of Rayville. So in 1908, the village of Youngsville was incorporated, with the name meaning "young village". It chose a government of a mayor and three aldermen.
 
On January 20, 1983, Louisiana Governor David C. Treen declared Youngsville a town. The town increased its governing body to a mayor and five aldermen to accommodate its population.

Youngsville was the fastest growing town in Louisiana from 1990 to 2005. Its population has increased by over 300 percent. According to the 2010 U.S. census, Youngsville grew at a rate of 103% between year 2000 and 2010. Youngsville was declared a city by Governor Kathleen Blanco in 2006. In 2007, Mayor Wilson Viator and the Youngsville City Council named Joey Langlinais as the Chairman of the Centennial Committee.

Although the city has extended its boundaries and expanded its services, Youngsville has remained a rural city surrounded by sugarcane farms.

On the morning of August 12, 2016, rain began to fall over Youngsville, as well as much of the south central part of the state, in what is now being considered to be the state's worst flood disaster by rainfall on record, in some areas.

The Louisiana flood of 2016 was triggered by a complicated, slow-moving low-pressure weather system that dumped as much as two feet of rain on several parishes in 48 hours. The record two-day rainfall in some areas had a 0.1 percent chance of occurring in any year, the equivalent of a "1,000-year rain", according to the Lower Mississippi River Forecast Center, based at the Slidell office of the National Weather Service.

In the two-day period ending Saturday at 8 p.m., several areas also saw rainfall amounts equaling a 1 percent chance of occurring in any year, a so-called 100-year event. The Red Cross called this "the worst natural disaster since Hurricane Sandy".

Geography
Youngsville is located in southeastern Lafayette Parish at  (30.100595, -91.990707). It is bordered to the north by Lafayette, the parish seat, and to the east by the city of Broussard.

Demographics

As of the 2020 United States census, there were 15,929 people, 4,396 households, and 3,883 families residing in the city. At the 2019 American Community Survey, the racial and ethnic makeup of the city was 79.6% non-Hispanic white, 12.3% Black and African American, 2.4% Asian, 2.8% multiracial, and 2.9% Hispanic and Latin American of any race. In 2019, for every 100 females there were 94.4 males, and the median age of the city's population was 33.1. Of the population, 11.2% lived at or the below poverty line, and there was a median household income of $89,038.

Education

Public schools
Youngsville is part of the Lafayette Parish School System.

The public elementary schools in Youngsville are Green T. Lindon Elementary School (located in downtown Youngsville) and Ernest Gallet Elementary School (located on Highway 92 between Chemin Metairie Parkway and Bonin Road). The Youngsville Middle School hosts students in sixth through eighth grades and is located at the corner of School Street and Church Street in downtown Youngsville.  All public school students from Youngsville attend Southside High in Youngsville or attend Ovey Comeaux High School in southern Lafayette.

Private schools
Private schools in the city include Westminster Christian Academy, located on the outskirts of Youngsville, and Youngsville Christian School, offering Kindergarten thru 12th grade in downtown Youngsville. Ascension Episcopal School, a private high school, is located near the Youngsville Sports Complex on Chemin Metaire Parkway across from Sugar Mill Pond.

Transportation
The city of Youngsville began construction of the Chemin Metairie Parkway Project in the spring of 2007 to improve the roads in and around Youngsville. The first segment, from the intersection of Highway 92 and Chemin Metairie, to central Youngsville, opened in early 2009. Originally called the Youngsville Parkway, the road was renamed to avoid confusion with the existing Youngsville Highway also known as Highway 89. Chemin Metairie Parkway joins Highway 90 near the Baker Hughes Complex in Broussard.  A section of the parkway passes through the Sugar Mill Pond development and a new shopping complex anchored by Lafayette Parish's first Rouse's Grocery Store.

In recent years, Youngsville has become known for its roundabouts. It was the first community within Lafayette Parish to embrace the usage of traffic circles to ease the congestion of the city's rising population. Youngsville now boasts at least 10 roundabouts at the following intersections:

 Highway 92 and Verot School Road
 Highway 92 and Chemin Metairie Parkway
 Highway 92 and Bonin Road
 Highway 92 and Highway 89
 Highway 89 and Chemin Metairie Parkway
 Fortune Road and Bonin Road
 Copper Meadow Boulevard and Fountain View Drive
 Prescott Boulevard and Broyles Lane
 Desbrook Lane and Annaberg Drive
 Viaulet Road and Chemin Metairie Parkway

The citizens of Youngsville voted in favor of a multi million-dollar, 70-acre sports complex along Chemin Metairie Parkway near Savoy Road. Construction to this complex began in 2012 and now has over 500,000 players and visitors coming to this state of the art facility.

References

External links
 Official website
 Youngsville Sports Complex
 Youngsville Chamber of Commerce

Populated places established in 1908
Cities in Louisiana
Cities in Lafayette Parish, Louisiana
Cities in Lafayette, Louisiana metropolitan area
1908 establishments in Louisiana